During World War II, the United States Army Air Forces (USAAF) established numerous airfields in Maine for training pilots and aircrews of USAAF fighters and bombers.

Most of these airfields were under the command of First Air Force or the Army Air Forces Training Command (AAFTC) (A predecessor of the current-day United States Air Force Air Education and Training Command). However the other USAAF support commands (Air Technical Service Command (ATSC); Air Transport Command (ATC) or Troop Carrier Command) commanded a significant number of airfields in a support roles.

It is still possible to find remnants of these wartime airfields. Many were converted into municipal airports, some were returned to agriculture and several were retained as United States Air Force installations and were front-line bases during the Cold War. Hundreds of the temporary buildings that were used survive today, and are being used for other purposes.

Major Airfields 
First Air Force
 Dow AAF, Bangor
 7th Army Air Force Base Unit
 Was: Dow Air Force Base (1947 – 1968)
 Now: Bangor Air National Guard Base and Bangor International Airport 

Air Transport Command
 Presque Isle AAF, Presque Isle
 North Atlantic Wing, ATC
 494th Army Air Force Base Unit
 Was: Presque Isle Air Force Base (1948 – 1961)
 Now: Northern Maine Regional Airport at Presque Isle 
 Houlton AAF, Houlton
 North Atlantic Wing, ATC
 378th Army Air Force Base Unit
 Now: Houlton International Airport

Bibliography 
 Maurer, Maurer. (1983). Air Force Combat Units Of World War II. Maxwell AFB, Alabama: Office of Air Force History. .
 Ravenstein, Charles A. (1984). Air Force Combat Wings Lineage and Honors Histories 1947 – 1977. Maxwell AFB, Alabama: Office of Air Force History. .
 Thole, Lou. (1999). Forgotten Fields of America: World War II Bases and Training, Then and Now - Volume 2. Pictorial Histories Pub. .

External links 
 Military Airfields in World War II - Maine

 01
World War II
Airfields of the United States Army Air Forces in the United States by state
United States World War II army airfields